Lead validation is the process by which sales leads generated by internet marketing campaigns are separated from other types of conversions. Lead validation is crucial for effective internet marketing management; without it, companies can neither accurately evaluate the results of, nor efficiently improve, their SEO, PPC, display advertising, email, content marketing and social media campaigns.

Definitions
Three other terms are particularly important to any discussion of lead validation:
 Conversion. A conversion (also referred to as an inquiry) is a response to an Internet marketing campaign, such as an online form being submitted, content being downloaded, or a phone call being placed. It is important to note that a conversion is not the same as a sales lead. A conversion could be a prospect inquiring about a company's products or services — but it could also be a customer lodging a complaint, a sales solicitation or some other non-sales related communication.
 Conversion Rate. The conversion rate of an Internet marketing campaign is the number of website visitors who complete a desired action, divided by the total number of visitors. For example, if 10,000 visitors come to a PPC landing page and 500 submit the page's inquiry form, the conversion rate is 5 percent.
 Validated Conversion Rate. The validated conversion rate is the net conversion rate after the lead validation process has removed non-sales lead inquires. So, returning to the example above (see Conversion Rate), if 10,000 visitors come to a PPC landing page, 500 submit the page's inquiry form, and 300 of those are true sales leads, the validated conversion rate of the campaign is 3 percent.

In the examples cited above, the importance of lead validation becomes clear: Without lead validation, the PPC advertiser will assume it has received 200 leads (500 inquiries versus 300 validated leads) that do not, in fact, exist. This serious flaw in analytics causes several marketing- and business-related problems.

Methods of Generating Leads Online
Companies have several options for online lead generation, each having its own campaign structures, metrics and set of best practices. The most important and typically most effective options are:
 SEO. SEO, search engine optimization, strives to make a company's online content as visible as possible on Google, Bing and other search engines in organic results for search queries relevant to its products and services. Because Google withholds organic keyword data from webmasters, accurate conversion analysis has become more important than ever in the structuring of SEO campaign tracking, since it has far more meaning than ranking data.
 PPC. PPC, pay-per-click advertising, strives to display ads prominently on Google, Bing and other search engines for search queries relevant to its products and services. Many PPC campaigns are primarily or entirely focused on immediate lead generation; therefore, obtaining accurate conversion data is imperative.
 Display Advertising. Display advertising strives to display ads on Web content based on past user behavior, and/or on websites whose audiences are relevant to the advertiser. Popular types of display advertising include retargeting, contextual targeting and site targeting. Display advertising campaigns can focus on immediate lead generation, or be combined with longer-term brand-building objectives.
 Email Marketing. Email marketing is used in a variety of ways to reach new customers and deepen relationships with existing customers. Email content is used extensively by consumer businesses for direct lead generation; B2B firms use email for both direct lead generation and other purposes such as information sharing and credibility building.
 Content Marketing. Content marketing involves the use of online content publication and distribution for the ultimate purpose of lead generation. (Content marketing also includes publishing and distributing content offline.) Frequently, content marketing is used for the specific lead generation purpose of building a house mailing list, by offering high-quality content as downloads that function as secondary offers. In addition, content marketing may utilize an indirect lead generation strategy—for example, publishing content with no direct call to action, with the expectation that its high intrinsic value will attract prospects and referrals.
 Social Media Marketing. Social media marketing involves a company's active participation in one or more social media platforms. While the objectives of social media marketing vary widely and sometimes do not include a lead generation component, it can be highly effective for direct lead generation provided the company's social community(s) is engaged, of sufficient size and properly targeted.

Other types of non-sales lead inquiries include the following:
 Customer service. Current customers phoning or submitting a form for customer service support regarding a product, service, billing, etc.
 General business. Phone calls or form submissions from a company's vendors and stakeholders, communications from government agencies, inquiries from journalists, etc.
 Peer-to-peer. Internal communications, networking requests from competitors or complementary product/service providers, etc.
 Personal. Phone calls and form submissions of a personal nature
 Sales solicitation. Existing or potential vendors using phone calls and form submissions to pitch services
 Spam. Automated or semi-automated form submissions or phone calls with or without a legitimate business intent

Further reading
 
 
 
 
 
 

Digital marketing
Sales